Jack Watts (birthdate unknown at this time) was a Negro leagues catcher. He played most of his career with the Indianapolis ABCs.

In addition to baseball, Watts was also a pugilist.

References

External links

Chicago American Giants players
Dayton Marcos players
Indianapolis ABCs players
Pittsburgh Keystones players
Year of birth missing
Year of death missing
Baseball catchers